Change the World is a live album from Christian singer Martha Munizzi. The album was released on April 1, 2008.

Track listing 

All songs written by Israel Houghton, Aaron Lindsey, and Martha Munizzi, except where noted.
 "Invincible God" - 04:54
 "Invincible - Overture" - 00:47
 "Nothing Can Separate Me" (Lindsey) - 04:15
 "Dance" - 04:33
 "Dance" (Reprise) - 03:17
 "Favor Of God" (Lindsey, Rowsey) - 05:20
 "Favor Of God" (Reprise) (Lindsey, Rowsey) - 03:24
 "Spoken Word - Interlude" - 01:37
 "More Than Enough" (Houghton, Munizzi) - 06:57
 "Wrap Me In Your Arms" (Gungor) - 07:29
 "Jesus Loves Me" (Anna Bartlett Warner) - 00:47
 "Forever Always" (Lindsey, Munizzi) - 04:11
 "I Receive Your Love" - 04:58
 "The King" - 05:09
 "Habitation" - 08:39
 "Change The World" - 06:21

Awards 

Change the World won a Dove Award for Contemporary Gospel Album of the Year at the 40th GMA Dove Awards. The song "Favor of God" was also nominated for a Dove Award for Contemporary Gospel Recorded Song of the Year.

Chart performance 

The album peaked at #135 on Billboard 200, #6 on Billboard's Christian Albums, #4 on Billboard's Gospel Albums, and #17 on Billboard's Independent Albums. It spent 61 weeks on the Gospel Albums charts.

References

External links 
 Change the World at Amazon.com

2008 live albums
Martha Munizzi albums